Broadcast City was the headquarters and broadcast complex of the television and radio networks owned by Roberto Benedicto, namely - Banahaw Broadcasting Corporation (BBC), Radio Philippines Network (RPN) and Intercontinental Broadcasting Corporation (IBC). It was located at Old Balara, Capitol Hills, Diliman, Quezon City and served as the three network's main television and radio production center and main transmission facility. It was inaugurated in July 1978 and was the most modern broadcast facility at that time. 

After the 1986 People Power Revolution toppled the government of Ferdinand Marcos, Broadcast City and the three networks were sequestered by the new government and placed under the management of a Board of Administrators tasked to operate and manage its business and affairs subject to the control and supervision of Presidential Commission on Good Government (PCGG).

BBC ended its operations on March 20, 1986, and its radio (101.9 FM) and television frequencies and one frequency from RPN (630 AM) were awarded back to ABS-CBN in July 1986. 

In 2011, IBC entered into a joint venture agreement with Prime Realty, an affiliate of R-II Builders Group of Reghis Romero Jr. The agreement called for the development of 3.5 hectares of Broadcast City. 

In October 2012, RPN was acquired by the Solar TV Network and discontinued use of the Broadcast City facilities. 

IBC has discontinued the use of Broadcast City since December 2018. Broadcast City was demolished on 2020 to give way for the Larossa Condominium project of Primehomes Real Estate Development Inc.

References

See also
Banahaw Broadcasting Corporation
Radio Philippines Network
Intercontinental Broadcasting Corporation

Buildings and structures completed in 1976
Buildings and structures demolished in 2020
1976 establishments in the Philippines
2018 disestablishments in the Philippines
Television studios in the Philippines
Demolished buildings and structures in the Philippines
Radio Philippines Network
Intercontinental Broadcasting Corporation
Buildings and structures in Quezon City
Mass media in Metro Manila